Religious harmony in India is a concept that indicates that there is love, affection between different religions in India. The Indian constitution supports and encourages religious harmony. In India, every citizen has a right to choose and practice any religion. There are examples of Muslims and Sikhs building temples. In India, different religious traditions live harmoniously. Seers of religions call for religious harmony in India. For popular film stars in India like Salman Khan, festivals of Hindus and Muslims are equal. According to Dalai Lama, India is a model for religious harmony. He mentions that "In the last 2000-3000 years, different religious traditions, such as Jainism, Islam, Sikhism, and others, have flourished here.". The whole concept of religious harmony is the most valuable treasure of India. In a lecture organized on the silver jubilee of Seshadripuram Educational Trust, Dalai Lama further said that though religions have various philosophies and spiritual traditions, all of them carry the same message of love. He also emphasized the importance of acknowledging each other as brothers and sisters. As mentioned by Dalai Lama, reviving ancient Indian knowledge helps us to live peacefully and in perfect harmony with other communities. This kind of knowledge guides us to the right path and paves the way for a happy and peaceful community and world.

Historical tradition
The ancient Indian scripture Rigveda endeavors plurality of religious thought with its mention "ekaM sadvipraa bahudhaa vadanti " (Sanskrit: एकं सद्विप्रा बहुधा वदन्ति)– meaning wise people explain the same truth in different manners. It is a Upanishadic statement from the yore which signifies that "One God Is Worshipped In Different Names." It also literally means "Truth is one, the wise perceive it differently". We might call God in various names but perceive him in multiple ways but he is the only one or the enlightened one.

Ashoka (304–232 BC), in his 12th edict stated:"The beloved of the gods, king Piyadasi, honors both ascetics and the householders of all religions, and he honors them with gifts and honors of various kinds. . Whoever praises his religion, due to excessive devotion, and condemns others with the thought "Let me glorify my religion," only harms his religion. Therefore contact between religions is good. One should listen to and respect the doctrines professed by others. The beloved of the gods, king Piyadasi, desires that all should be well-learned in the good doctrines of other religions. "After the Kalinga war, Ashoka adopted the philosophy of Buddhism and devoted himself to the promotion of Dhamma. He was also known as the pioneer of social harmony. For him, dharma was not restricted to religion or religious beliefs. Dhamma was rather a way of life that revolved around moral principles. These principles would provide a moral law to humans and not malign or demean any other religion to establish your religion. In his second inscription, he wrote, "What is Dhamma? Minor misdeeds and more misdeeds. Avoiding evils like fury, cruelty, anger, arrogance, and jealousy and attachment in kindness, generosity, truth, self-control, simplicity, purity of heart, and morality. Observance of ethics, internal and external purity etc."

Kharavela (193 BC – after 170 BC) was the third and greatest emperor of the Mahameghavahana dynasty of Kaḷinga (present-day Odisha). The main source of information about Khārabeḷa is his famous seventeen lines rock-cut Hātigumphā inscription in a cave in the Udayagiri hills near Bhubaneswar, Odisha. The inscription states that Emperor Kharavela had a liberal religious spirit. Kharavela describes himself as:
“ सव पासंड पूजको सवदेवायतन संकार कारको ” (Prakrit language, Devanagari script)
Translation: The worshiper of all religious orders, the restorer of shrines of all gods.

The Grahapati Kokkala inscription dated to 1000-1001 AD equates 
Verse 3 equates Shiva with Parama Brahma, Buddha, Vaman, and Jina.

Dharmasthala Temple

Dharmasthala Temple is a great example of religious harmony in India, as the priests of the temple are Shivalli Brahmins, who are Vaishnava, and the administration is run by a Jain Bunt family.

Ajmer Sharif Dargah

A dargah is a shrine built over the grave of a revered religious figure, often a Sufi saint or dervish. Sufis often visit the shrine for ziyarat, a term associated with religious visits and "pilgrimages". Within Islamic Sufism or in other words, Islamic mysticism, Sufi Saints often shared messages of unity to the divine and promoted love of God, discouraging the discrimination of people solely based on religious denomination. For these historical and cultural reasons, dargahs, such as the Ajmer Sharif Dargah, have been a place for Muslims, Hindus, and people of other faiths since medieval times.

Efforts
The late 19th century and early 20th century Indian guru and yogi Sai Baba of Shirdi preached religious harmony through his teaching. To practise and promote it he combined the celebration of the Hindu festival of Rama Navami with a Muslim Urs. Lokmanya Tilak organised the programmes like Ganesh Chaturthi and Shivjayanti to preach religious harmony among the people. Muslims used to play the dhol during the visarjan of the Ganesha idol that marks the culmination of Ganesh Chaturthi. The Lalbaugcha Raja of Mumbai, an annually set up Ganesha idol, is also worshipped by Muslims. In 2019, a Hindu family in West Bengal chose to worship a Muslim girl as a part of Kumari Puja, a ritual performed during the Hindu festival of Durga Puja.

Political, military, and business leaders

Even though India is predominantly Hindu, its leaders have often included Muslims, Sikhs, Christians, Jains, Zoroastrians, etc.

 Presidents of India: Dr. Zakir Hussain, Mohammad Hidayatullah, Fakhruddin Ali Ahmed, Dr. A. P. J. Abdul Kalam were Muslim and Giani Zail Singh was a Sikh.
 Army Chief: Sam Hormusji Framji Jamshedji Manekshaw was a Zoroastrian, Sunith Francis Rodrigues was a Christian, Joginder Jaswant Singh and Bikram Singh were Sikhs.
 The list of India's 100 richest people includes Dilip Shanghvi, a Jain, Azim Premji, a Muslim, and Pallonji Mistri, a Zoroastrian.

See also
 Composite nationalism
 Din-i Ilahi
 Ethnic relations in India
 Freedom of religion in India
 Ganga-Jamuni tehzeeb
 Phool Walon Ki Sair
 Religious syncretism
 Sarva Dharma Sammelan
 Ajmer Sharif Dargah

References

Further reading
 Jain, Sandhya (2010). Evangelical intrusions: [Tripura, a case study]. New Delhi: Rupa & Co.
 Elst, K. (2002). Who is a Hindu?: Hindu revivalist views of Animism, Buddhism, Sikhism, and other offshoots of Hinduism.
 Goel, S.G. 2016. History of Hindu-Christian encounters, AD 304 to 1996.
 Panikkar, K. M. (1959). Asia and Western dominance. London: Allen & Unwin. 
 Rajiv Malhotra (2011), Being Different: An Indian Challenge to Western Universalism (Publisher: HarperCollins India)
 Swarup, Ram (1984). Buddhism vis-a-vis Hinduism.
 Swarup, R. (1995). Hindu view of Christianity and Islam. 
 Shourie, Arun. (2006). Missionaries in India: Continuities, Changes, dilemmas. New Delhi: Rupa.
 Madhya Pradesh (India)., & Niyogi, M. B. (1956). Vindicated by time: The Niyogi Committee report on Christian missionary activities. Nagpur: Government Printing, Madhya Pradesh.
 Narain, Harsh (1997). Myths of composite culture and equality of religions. New Delhi: Voice of India.

Religious pluralism
Religion in India
Social history of India